The Cook County, Illinois, general election was held on November 4, 2014.

Primaries were held March 18, 2014.

Elections were held for Assessor, Clerk, Sheriff, Treasurer, President of the Cook County Board of Commissioners, all 17 seats of the Cook County Board of Commissioners, Cook County Board of Review seat 3, three seats on the Water Reclamation District Board, and judgeships on the Circuit Court of Cook County.

Election information
2014 was a midterm election year in the United States. The primaries and general elections for Cook County races coincided with those for federal congressional races and those for state elections.

Voter turnout
Voter turnout in Cook County during the primaries was 16.26%, with 458,396 ballots cast. Among these, 285,728 Democratic, 169,922 Republican, 245 Green, and 2,501 nonpartisan primary ballots were cast. The city of Chicago saw 16.54% turnout and suburban Cook County saw 15.99% turnout.

The general election saw 49.30% turnout, with 1,364,436 ballots cast. The city of Chicago saw 48.81% turnout and suburban Cook County saw 49.79% turnout.

Assessor 

In the 2014 Cook County Assessor election, incumbent first-term Assessor Joseph Berrios, a Democrat, was reelected, running unopposed in both the Democratic primary and general election.

Primaries

Democratic

Republican
No candidates, ballot-certified or formal write-in, ran in the Republican primary.

General election

Clerk 

In the 2014 Cook County Clerk election, incumbent sixth-term Clerk David Orr, a Democrat, was reelected, running unopposed in both the Democratic primary and the general election.

Primaries

Democratic

Republican
No candidates, ballot-certified or formal write-in, ran in the Republican primary.

General election

Sheriff 

In the 2014 Cook County Sheriff election, incumbent second-term Sheriff Tom Dart, a Democrat, was reelected.

Primaries

Democratic

Republican
No candidates, ballot-certified or formal write-in, ran in the Republican primary.

General election

Treasurer 

In the 2014 Cook County Treasurer election, incumbent fourth-term Treasurer Maria Pappas, a Democrat, was reelected, running unopposed in both the Democratic primary and general election.

Primaries

Democratic

Republican
No candidates, ballot-certified or formal write-in, ran in the Republican primary.

General election

President of the Cook County Board of Commissioners 

In the 2014 President of the Cook County Board of Commissioners election, incumbent first-term President Toni Preckwinkle, a Democrat, was reelected.

Primaries

Democratic

Republican
No candidates, ballot-certified or formal write-in, ran in the Republican primary.

General election

Cook County Board of Commissioners 

The 2014 Cook County Board of Commissioners election saw all seventeen seats of the Cook County Board of Commissioners up for election to four-year terms.

Fifteen members were reelected.  One member did not seek reelection. One member was defeated in their party's primary. This meant that a total of two individuals were newly-elected.

As these were the first elections held following the 2010 United States Census, the seats faced redistricting before this election.

1st district

Incumbent fourth-term Commissioner Earlean Collins, a Democrat, did not seek reelection. Democrat Richard Boykin was elected to succeed him.

Primaries

Democratic

Republican
No candidates, ballot-certified or formal write-in, ran in the Republican primary.

General election

2nd district

Incumbent second-term commissioner Robert Steele, a Democrat, was reelected, running unopposed in both the Democratic primary and general election.

Primaries

Democratic

Republican
No candidates, ballot-certified or formal write-in, ran in the Republican primary.

General election

3rd district

Incumbent Commissioner Jerry Butler, a Democrat who first assumed the office in 1985, was reelected.

Primaries

Democratic

Republican
No candidates, ballot-certified or formal write-in, ran in the Republican primary.

General election

4th district

Incumbent Commissioner Stanley Moore, a Democrat who was appointed to the office in 2013, was reelected to a full term.

Primaries

Democratic

Republican
No candidates, ballot-certified or formal write-in, ran in the Republican primary.

General election

5th district

Incumbent fifth-term Commissioner Deborah Sims, a Democrat, was reelected.

Primaries

Democratic

Republican
No candidates, ballot-certified or formal write-in, ran in the Republican primary.

General election

6th district

Incumbent third-term Commissioner Joan Patricia Murphy, a Democrat, was reelected.

Primaries

Democratic

Republican
No candidates, ballot-certified or formal write-in, ran in the Republican primary.

General election

7th district

Incumbent first-term Commissioner Jesús "Chuy" García, a Democrat, was reelected.

Primaries

Democratic

Republican
No candidates, ballot-certified or formal write-in, ran in the Republican primary.

General election

8th district

Incumbent Commissioner Edwin Reyes, a Democrat, lost reelection, being unseated in the Democratic primary by Luis Arroyo Jr., who went on to win the general election unopposed.

Reyes had first been appointed in 2009 (after Roberto Maldonado resigned to serve a Chicago alderman), and had been elected to a full term in 2010.

Primaries

Democratic

Republican
No candidates, ballot-certified or formal write-in, ran in the Republican primary.

General election

9th district

Incumbent fifth-term Commissioner Peter N. Silvestri, a Republican, was reelected.

Primaries

Democratic

Republican

General election

10th district

Incumbent Commissioner Bridget Gainer, a Democrat first appointed in 2009 and elected outright to a full-term in 2010, was reelected, running unopposed in both the Democratic primary and general election.

Primaries

Democratic

Republican
No candidates, ballot-certified or formal write-in, ran in the Republican primary.

General election

11th district

Incumbent Commissioner John P. Daley, a Democrat in office since 1992, was reelected.

Primaries

Democratic

Republican

General election

12th district

Incumbent first-term Commissioner John Fritchey, a Democrat, was reelected, running unopposed in both the Democratic primary and general election.

Primaries

Democratic

Republican
No candidates, ballot-certified or formal write-in, ran in the Republican primary.

General election

13th district

Incumbent third-term Commissioner Larry Suffredin, a Democrat, was reelected, running unopposed in both the Democratic primary and general election.

Primaries

Democratic

Republican
No candidates, ballot-certified or formal write-in, ran in the Republican primary.

General election

14th district

Incumbent fourth-term Commissioner Gregg Goslin, a Republican, was reelected, running unopposed in both the Republican primary and general election.

Primaries

Democratic
No candidates, ballot-certified or formal write-in, ran in the Democratic primary.

Republican

General election

15th district

Incumbent second-term Commissioner Tim Schneider, a Republican, was reelected.

Primaries

Democratic

Republican

General election

16th district

Incumbent first-term Commissioner Jeff Tobolski, a Democrat, was reelected, running unopposed in both the Democratic primary and general election.

Primaries

Democratic

Republican
No candidates, ballot-certified or formal write-in, ran in the Republican primary.

General election

17th district

Incumbent third-term Commissioner Elizabeth Ann Doody Gorman, a Republican, was reelected.

Primaries

Democratic

Republican

General election

Cook County Board of Review

In the 2014 Cook County Board of Review election, one seat, Democratic-held, out of its three seats was up for election. Incumbent Larry Rogers, Jr. was reelected.

The Cook County Board of Review has its three seats rotate the length of terms. In a staggered fashion (in which no two seats have coinciding two-year terms), the seats rotate between two consecutive four-year terms and a two-year term.

3rd district

Incumbent third-term member Larry Rogers, Jr., a Democrat last reelected in 2012, was reelected, running unopposed in both the Democratic primary and general election. This election was to a four-year term.

Primaries

Democratic

Republican
No candidates, ballot-certified or formal write-in, ran in the Republican primary.

General election

Water Reclamation District Board 

In the 2014 Metropolitan Water Reclamation District of Greater Chicago  election, three of the nine seats on the Metropolitan Water Reclamation District of Greater Chicago board were up for election in an at-large race. Since three six-year seats were up for election, voters could vote for up to three candidates and the top-three finishers would win.

Two of the incumbents for the three seats were seeking reelection, Cynthia M. Santos and Frank Avila  both Democrats. Each won reelection. Joining them in winning the general election was fellow Democrat Tim Bradford.

Primaries

Democratic

Republican

General election

Judicial elections 

11 judgeships on the Circuit Court of Cook County were up for partisan elections due to vacancies. 72 circuit court judges had retention elections.

15 subcircuit courts judgeships were also up for partisan elections due to vacancies. Multiple subcircuit judges had retention elections.

Other elections
Coinciding with the primaries, elections were held to elect both the Democratic and Republican committeemen for the suburban townships.

See also 
 2014 Illinois elections

References 

Cook County, Illinois
Cook County
2014
Cook County 2014